Aronia prunifolia, called the purple chokeberry, is a North American species of shrubs in the rose family. It is native to eastern Canada and to the eastern and central United States, from Nova Scotia west to Ontario and Wisconsin, south as far as western South Carolina with an isolated population reported in southern Alabama.

Some authors consider this to be a hybrid rather than a full-fledged species but it does grow in places where neither parent is present (most of Michigan for example). This independence merits acceptance as a full species. This sort of thing is not unusual; many species of plants originated as hybrids.

Aronia prunifolia is a branching shrub forming clumps by means of stems forming from the roots. Flowers are white or pink, producing purple fruits. Many people consider the fruits to be foul-tasting.

References

External links
 

prunifolia
Flora of Eastern Canada
Flora of the United States
Plants described in 1785